Jean-Louis Tournadre (born 17 November 1958) is a French former Grand Prix motorcycle road racer. Born in Clermont-Ferrand, he became France's first FIM road racing world champion when he clinched the 1982 250cc title aboard a Yamaha TZ250.

Despite only having one victory to his rival Anton Mang's five victories, Tournadre amassed enough podium results to win the championship by one point. His only victory came at the French Grand Prix held at Nogaro where most of the top riders, including Mang and Carlos Lavado, went on strike to protest the lack of safety at the circuit. In 1988, Tournadre competed in the Hockenheim round of the World Superbike Championship.

Motorcycle Grand Prix Results
Points system from 1969 to 1987:

(key) (Races in bold indicate pole position; races in italics indicate fastest lap)

References 

Sportspeople from Clermont-Ferrand
French motorcycle racers
250cc World Championship riders
350cc World Championship riders
Superbike World Championship riders
1958 births
Living people
250cc World Riders' Champions